St. Stephen's Greek Orthodox Cathedral is the seat of the Greek Orthodox Metropolis of France in Paris. It is located at 7 rue Georges-Bizet, in the 16th arrondissement of Paris. It was consecrated on 22 December 1895.

History 

Before the church was consecrated, there had been at least two attempts at creating a permanent Greek Orthodox place of worship in Paris. The church was commissioned by Demetrius Stefanovich Schilizzi, designed by architect Émile Vaudremer, and built by Guillotin. The purchase price of the site and construction cost amounted to F1,630,000 in total. The inside walls were decorated by Charles Lameire and the marble iconostasis by Ludwig Thiersch. Léon Avenet worked on the stained glass.

The absolution of Eleftherios Venizelos was performed there on 21 March 1936. The wedding of Édith Piaf and Théo Sarapo was celebrated there also on 9 October 1962. The funerary liturgy of Maria Callas was also held in the cathedral on 20 September 1977.

Gallery

References

External links

Greek Orthodox cathedrals in Europe
Monuments historiques of Paris
Churches completed in 1895
16th arrondissement of Paris
Cathedrals in Paris
Eastern Orthodox church buildings in Paris
Greek Orthodox Metropolis of France
19th-century Eastern Orthodox church buildings
19th-century churches in France